= Messongo, Virginia =

Unincorporated community in Virginia, United States

Coordinates: 37°54′52″N 75°38′22″W

Messongo is an unincorporated community in Accomack County, Virginia, United States.
